Sherif Arafa (born on December 25, 1960) is an Egyptian director, writer and producer. He graduated from the Higher Institute of Cinema in 1982.

Sharif Arafa participated in the making of many of the movies in the history of Egyptian cinema, such as Birds of Darkness , Mafia, Halim and Welad El Am.
He produced several  television works such as Tamer we shawkeya and "Lahazat Harega" "Critical moments".

He was famous for his political movies with the writer "Wahid Hamed"

Awards
He received many awards during his career such as:
Awards for best director and best film of the Egyptian Culture Minister Farouk Hosni to play movies with adults, Terrorism and Kebab and The forgotten
Silver Award for best film festival in 1992 Milan African Film and film terrorism kebab
Bronze Award for best film festival in Venice in 1995 for "dark birds
Silver Award for best film festival in Milan in 1995 for "dark birds
The prize for best out of the festival's national cinema in 2007 for the film Halim.

Family
Both his father, Saad Arafa, and his younger brother, Amr Arafa, are directors.

External links
 
  Sherif Arafa : official website of the artist, director and writer and producer of films
 https://www.elcinema.com/en/person/1004016/

1960 births
Egyptian film directors
Living people